Rippweiler is a small town in the commune of Useldange, in western Luxembourg.  , the town has a population of 183.

References

Redange (canton)
Towns in Luxembourg